Amarotypus is a genus of ground beetles in the family Carabidae. This genus has a single species, Amarotypus edwardsii, found in New Zealand.

References

Migadopinae

Migadopinae